Farnetella is a village in Tuscany, central Italy, administratively a frazione of the comune of Sinalunga, province of Siena. At the time of the 2001 census its population was 96.

References 

Frazioni of Sinalunga